Euxoa oberfoelli, or Oberfoell's dart moth, is a species of cutworm or dart moth in the family Noctuidae. It is found in North America.

The MONA or Hodges number for Euxoa oberfoelli is 10818.

References

Further reading

 
 
 

Euxoa
Moths described in 1973